Leucotmemis melini is a moth of the subfamily Arctiinae. It was described by Felix Bryk in 1953. It is found in the Amazon region.

References

 

Leucotmemis
Moths described in 1953